Humanity World International (hwi), founded in 2004, is a nonprofit, non-denominational international volunteering and intern organization based in Accra, Ghana.  HWI arranges specific work placements for international volunteers, interns and students worldwide. In addition to its volunteer and internship projects, it undertakes donor-funded projects, including advocacy, human rights campaigns, research and humanitarian projects.

Humanity World International works in the fields of education, health, human rights, advocacy and research.

References

International development agencies
International volunteer organizations
Organizations established in 2004
Charities based in Ghana